Nasreddine Kraouche (born 27 August 1979 in Thionville) is a former professional football midfielder. Born in France, he represented Algeria at international level.

Career statistics
Source:

References

1979 births
Living people
People from Thionville
Sportspeople from Moselle (department)
Footballers from Grand Est 
Association football midfielders
French footballers
Algerian footballers
Algeria international footballers
2000 African Cup of Nations players
2002 African Cup of Nations players
2004 African Cup of Nations players
FC Metz players
K.A.A. Gent players
R. Charleroi S.C. players
Belgian Pro League players
French sportspeople of Algerian descent
Ligue 1 players
Expatriate footballers in Belgium
Algerian expatriate sportspeople in Belgium
Algerian expatriate footballers
French expatriate sportspeople in Belgium
French expatriate footballers